Enrico Rava (born 20 August 1939), is an Italian jazz trumpeter. He started on trombone, then changed to the trumpet after hearing Miles Davis.

Career
He was born in Trieste, Italy.

His first commercial work was as a member of Gato Barbieri's Italian quintet in the mid-1960s; in the late 1960s he was a member of Steve Lacy's group. In 1967, Rava moved to New York City and, one month later, became a member of the group Gas Mask, which had one album released on Tonsil Records in 1970.

In the 1970s and 1980s, he worked with John Abercrombie, Andrea Centazzo, Gil Evans, Richard Galliano, Joe Henderson, Joe Lovano, Pat Metheny, Michel Petrucciani, Cecil Taylor, and Miroslav Vitouš. He has also worked with Carla Bley, Lee Konitz, Jeanne Lee, Paul Motian, and Roswell Rudd. Chiefly an exponent of bebop jazz, Rava has also played in avant-garde jazz settings.

With trumpeter Paolo Fresu, Rava recorded four albums on the influence of Bix Beiderbecke, Louis Armstrong, Chet Baker, and Miles Davis. Also of note are his albums Rava, L'Opera Va'  and Carmen, which are his interpretations of operatic arias and overtures. In 2001, he founded a quintet with pianist Stefano Bollani and toured with Gato Barbieri and Aldo Romano. In the trio Europeans, he worked with Eberhard Weber and Swiss percussionist Reto Weber.

In June 2005, Rava was awarded an Honorary Doctorate of Music from Berklee College of Music at the twentieth anniversary of jazz education at the Umbria Jazz Festival, in Perugia, Italy.

Discography

As leader/co-leader 
 Il Giro Del Giorno in 80 Mondi (Black Saint, 1972)
 Katcharpari (MPS/BASF, 1973)
 The Pilgrim and the Stars (ECM, 1975)
 Pupa o Crisalide (RCA, 1975)
 "Quotation Marks" (Japo, 1976)
 The Plot (ECM, 1977)
 Enrico Rava Quartet (ECM, 1978)
 Ah Enrico Rava (ECM 1980)
 Nexus Meets Enrico Rava (Four Leaf Clover 1984)
 Secrets (Soul Note, 1987)
 Volver with Dino Saluzzi (ECM, 1987)
 Quatre with D'Andrea, Vitous, Humair (Gala, 1989)
 Earthcake with D'Andrea, Vitous, Humair (Gala, 1991)
 Rava L'Opera Va (Label Bleu, 1993)
 Chanson (Gala, 1994)
 Nausicaa with Enrico Pieranunzi (EGEA, 1994)
 Bella with Pieranunzi, Pietropaoli, Gatto (Philology, 1994)
 Carmen (Label Bleu, 1995)
 Electric Five with Gianluigi Trovesi (Soul Note, 1995)
 For Bix and Pops (Philology, 1996)
 Noir (Label Bleu, 1996)
 Italian Ballads (Venus, 1996)
 Icon with Claudio Fasoli, Franco D'Andrea, (Flex, 1998)
 Ragazzi Selvaggi (Ricordi, 1998)
 Certi Angoli Segreti (Label Bleu, 1998)
 Rava Plays Rava (Philology, 1999)
 Duo En Noir with Ran Blake (Between the Lines, 1999)
 Shades of Chet (Via Veneto, 1999)
 Renaissance (Venus, 2002)
 Montreal Diary (Label Bleu, 2002)
 Smiling in Hollywood (GMG Music, 2002)
 What a Day!!! (Platinum, 2002)
 Full of Life (CAM Jazz, 2003)
 Easy Living (ECM, 2004)
 Tati (ECM, 2005)
 Jazzitaliano Live 2006 (Casa Del Jazz, 2006)
 The Words and the Days (ECM, 2007)
 The Third Man (ECM, 2007)
 New York Days (ECM, 2009)
 Jazzitaliano Live 2009 (Casa Del Jazz, 2009)
 Tribe (ECM, 2011)
 Rava on the Dance Floor (ECM, 2012) – live recorded in 2011
 The Monash Sessions (Jazzhead, 2014)
 Wild Dance (ECM, 2015)
 My Songbook (Casa Del Jazz, 2016)
  Roma with Joe Lovano (ECM, 2019)
 Edizione Speziale (ECM, 2021)
 The Song Is You with Fred Hersch (ECM, 2022) – recorded in 2021
 2 Blues for Cecil with Andrew Cyrille and William Parker (TUM, 2022) – recorded in 2021

As member 
European Jazz Ensemble
 20th Anniversary Tour (Konnex, 1997)
 At the Philharmonic Cologne (MA Music, 1989)

Globe Unity Orchestra
 Jahrmarkt & Local Fair (Po Torch, 1977)
 Pearls (FMP, 1977)
 Compositions (Japo, 1980)
 Baden-Baden '75 (FMP, 2011)

Italian Instabile Orchestra
 Italian Instabile Festival (Leo, 1998)
 Litania Sibilante (Enja, 2000)
 Previsioni Del Tempo = Forecast (Imprint, 2002)

As sideman 

With Gianni Basso
 Blue Woods (Philology, 2002)
 Tea for Two (Philology, 2005)

With Andrea Centazzo
 Live (Ictus, 2002)
 Doctor Faustus (Ictus, 2006)

With Giorgio Gaslini
 Nuovi Sentimenti Suite (La Voce Del Padrone, 1966)
 Message (BASF, 1973)

With Steve Lacy
 Sortie (GTA, 1966)
 The Forest and the Zoo (ESP-Disk, 1967)
 Roba (Saravah, 1972)
 Let's Call This (Hat Art, 1986)

With Roswell Rudd
 Numatik Swing Band (JCOA, 1973)
 Inside Job (Arista/Freedom, 1976)
 Blown Bone (Philips, 1979)

With Bruce Ditmas
 Aeray Dust (Chiaroscuro, 1977)
 Yellow Wizard (Wizard, 1977) – recorded in 1976

With others
 Nicola Arigliano, Go Man! (NuN 2001)
 Barry Altschul, Irina (Soul Note, 1983)
 Franco Ambrosetti, Grazie Italia (Enja, 2000)
 Karl Berger, No Man Is an Island (Douglas Music 1997)
 Carla Bley, Escalator over the Hill (JCOA, 1971)
 Salvatore Bonafede, Journey to Donnafugata (CAM Jazz, 2004)
 Dollar Brand, African Space Program (Enja, 1974)
 Barbara Casini, Vento (Label Bleu, 2000)
 Mario Castelnuovo, Come Sara Mio Figlio (RCA Italiana 1991)
 Marc Ducret, Gris (Label Bleu, 1990)
 Ivano Fossati, La Disciplina Della Terra (Columbia, 2000)
 Roberto Gatto, Roberto Gatto Plays Rugantino (CAM Jazz, 2000)
 George Gruntz, Happening Now! (hat ART, 1988)
 Gunter Hampel, Angel (Birth, 1972)
 Matthew Herbert, The State Between Us (Accidental, 2019)
 ICP Orchestra, Live Soncino (Instant Composers Pool, 1979)
 Stafford James, Jazz a Confronto 26 (Horo, 1976)
 Robin Kenyatta, Terra Nova (Atlantic, 1973)
 Lee Konitz, L'Age Mur (Philology, 1998)
 Jimmy Lyons, Give It Up (Black Saint, 1985)
 Rita Marcotulli, The Woman Next Door (Label Bleu, 1998)
 Gas Mask, Their first album (Tonsil, 1970)
 Banda Osiris, L'Imbalsamatore (Radiofandango, 2002)
 Jean-Marc Padovani, Nimeno (Label Bleu, 1991)
 Gianluca Petrella, Il Bidone (Spacebone, 2013)
 Enrico Pieranunzi, Ma L'Amore No (Soul Note, 1997)
 Enzo Pietropaoli, To... (Sentemo, 1992)
 Quatre, Earthcake (Label Bleu, 1991)
 Massimo Ranieri, Malia (Sony, 2015)
 Massimo Ranieri, Malia Parte II (NAR, 2016)
 Aldo Romano, Inner Smile (Dreyfus, 2011)
 Manfred Schoof, European Echoes (FMP, 1969)
 Renato Sellani, A Mina (Philology, 2004)
 Archie Shepp, Little Red Moon (Soul Note, 1986)
 Cecil Taylor, Winged Serpent (Sliding Quadrants) (Soul Note, 1985)
 Cecil Taylor, Alms/Tiergarten (Spree) (FMP, 1989)
 Gianmaria Testa, Altre Latitudinii (Le Chant Du Monde, 2003)
 Gianluigi Trovesi, Jazzitaliano Live 2007 (Casa Del Jazz, 2007)
 Piero Umiliani, Una Bella Grinta (CAM Jazz, 1965)
 Ornella Vanoni, Ti (Columbia/Sony 2004)
 Barney Wilen, Passione (Venus, 1995)

References

External links
 Official site
 Discography
 Review of The Words and the Days at JazzChicago.net
 Interview with Enrico Rava

1939 births
Living people
20th-century Italian male musicians
20th-century Italian musicians
21st-century Italian male musicians
21st-century Italian musicians
21st-century trumpeters
Avant-garde jazz musicians
ECM Records artists
European Jazz Ensemble members
Globe Unity Orchestra members
Italian jazz musicians
Italian jazz trumpeters
Male jazz musicians
Male trumpeters
Label Bleu artists
CAM Jazz artists
Black Saint/Soul Note artists